WRAY (1250 AM) is a radio station licensed to Princeton, Indiana, United States, the station serves the Evansville area.  The station is currently owned by Princeton Broadcasting Co.

AM and FM studios and transmitters are at 1900 West Broadway, in Princeton.

References

External links

RAY (AM)
News and talk radio stations in the United States
Radio stations established in 1975